Legislative elections were held in French Polynesia on 6 May 2001 for the Territorial Assembly. The result was a victory for Tahoera'a Huiraatira, which won 28 of 49 seats. The pro independence Tāvini Huiraʻatira won 13 seats, and Fetia Api 7. A single independent, Chantal Flores (associated with the Tapura Amui no Tuhaa Pae party), was elected in the Austral Islands. The Aia Api party failed to reach the 5% threshold and was eliminated from the Assembly.

Following the election Gaston Flosse was re-elected as President of French Polynesia.

Results

References

French
Legislative
Elections in French Polynesia
Election and referendum articles with incomplete results